WTPT (93.3 FM) is an active rock station licensed to Forest City, North Carolina, and serving the Upstate South Carolina and Western North Carolina regions, including Greenville, South Carolina and Asheville, North Carolina. The Audacy, Inc. outlet is licensed by the Federal Communications Commission (FCC) to broadcast with an ERP of 93 kW. The station goes by the name 93.3 The Planet Rocks.

The station broadcasts from near Columbus, North Carolina, with studios in Greenville, South Carolina. However, it is licensed to Forest City, North Carolina.

History
93.3, then known as WBBO-FM and WBBO-AM 780 ("We Build Business Opportunities"), signed on September 10, 1947 in Forest City, North Carolina. The station was owned by the Anderson family, which also owned the "Forest City Courier" newspaper and WPNF-AM in nearby Brevard, North Carolina. Both stations simulcasted with each other on a full-time basis until the late 60s. WBBO-FM featured a variety of formats throughout the next decade, including country and adult contemporary. On January 1, 1988, after building a tower on Tryon Peak near Columbus, North Carolina to improve its signal range, WBBO-FM switched to a satellite smooth jazz format, distributed from St. Paul, Minnesota, and began calling itself "The Breeze". artists included James Taylor, Sade, Sting, Stevie Wonder, Ramsey Lewis, as well as Windham Hill performers, and artists playing the music of Cole Porter. Listeners tended to be very educated and also enjoyed classical music and soft rock. WBBO-FM planned to move to Greenville, South Carolina in 1989. One listener described the music as "lasting quality ... not something that will be a big hit for six months and then fade away."

On February 14, 1991 (Valentines Day), WBBO-FM flipped to contemporary hit radio as "Power 93". This move brought back the format to the nearby Greenville-Spartanburg market that the former WANS (now WJMZ) had before they abandoned it for adult contemporary. Initially, ratings were very good, but quickly fizzled out to 9th place, where it stayed throughout much of its existence. In August of next year, the Power 93 moniker was dropped for "93.3 WBBO" as the station became more Dance-oriented. Again, ratings had shown little improvement and was re-adjusted toward Mainstream CHR within a year.

In mid-1994, the station was re-branded as "Q-93" and adopted a more uptempo-ed CHR format sprinkled with plenty of alternative rock. Ratings started to slowly tick upward, but the station was sold to Benchmark Communications (then-owners of WESC AM-FM) and the format was dropped altogether on January 1, 1995 for a younger-skewing country format as "93-Q Country" under the WFNQ-FM call letters. The station began the format with 19,095 songs in a row commercial-free, the most ever on a commercial radio station up to that time. The idea was to use WFNQ-FM as a flanker against then-rival country outlet WSSL-FM so that WESC-FM could be the #1 station in the market. This strategy failed miserablely as WFNQ-FM went to the bottom of the ratings within several months.

Programming also included the Christian music program Face to Face from Right Turn Radio.

On September 13, 1996, WFNQ-FM dropped Young Country for active rock as "93.3 The Planet". The call letters of WTPT-FM were adopted by the end of the year.  After being acquired by Clear Channel Communications in the late 1990s, Barnstable Broadcasting purchased the station in 1999, along with WROQ.  The company sold WTPT as well as WROQ and (then) WGVC-FM to Entercom Communications in 2005.

On February 23, 2022, WTPT added The Bet to its HD3 subchannel.

Translator
WTPT-HD2 programming is simulcast on the following translator:

Previous logo
 (WTPT's logo under previous "New Rock 93.3" branding)

References

External links

Active rock radio stations in the United States
TPT
Radio stations established in 1947
1947 establishments in North Carolina
Audacy, Inc. radio stations